Over the Garden Wall is an American animated television miniseries created by Patrick McHale for Cartoon Network. The series centers on two half-brothers who travel across a mysterious forest to find their way home, encountering a variety of strange and fantastical things on their journey. The show is based on McHale's animated short film Tome of the Unknown, which was produced as part of Cartoon Network Studios' shorts development program. Elijah Wood and Collin Dean voice the protagonists Wirt and Greg, and Melanie Lynskey voices Beatrice, a bluebird. The series' voice cast also includes Christopher Lloyd, Tim Curry, Bebe Neuwirth, Chris Isaak, Shirley Jones, Thomas Lennon,  Jack Jones, Jerron Paxton, John Cleese and Samuel Ramey. The Blasting Company composed the soundtrack. Over the Garden Wall was broadcast throughout the week of November 3 to November 7, 2014.

The show was the first miniseries on the network. McHale first envisioned it in 2004 and pitched it to the network in 2006. After working on other Cartoon Network shows including The Marvelous Misadventures of Flapjack and Adventure Time, the network expressed interest in McHale pitching a pilot. That pilot, Tome of the Unknown, became the catalyst for Over the Garden Wall. Production of the show began in March 2014 and was largely done in Burbank, California, but many of the show's storyboard artists worked from other U.S. cities, while the program's animation was outsourced to South Korean studio Digital eMation. The series' environment evokes 19th- and 20th-century Americana, while its digital backgrounds are designed to resemble brunaille paintings.

The series was well-received by television critics, who praised its atmosphere and characters. In 2015, the series won an Emmy Award for Outstanding Animated Program. A one-shot comic book adaptation penned by McHale has been produced, with four further issues commissioned. This was later expanded into an ongoing comic series that ran for 20 issues and continued in a series of graphic novels and comic book miniseries.

Plot
The series follows two half-brothers, Wirt and Greg (voiced by Elijah Wood and Collin Dean respectively), who become lost in a strange forest called the Unknown. To find their way home, the two must travel across the seemingly supernatural forest with the occasional help of the wandering, mysterious and elderly Woodsman (Christopher Lloyd) and Beatrice (Melanie Lynskey), an irritable bluebird who travels with the boys to find a woman called Adelaide, who can supposedly undo the curse on Beatrice and her family and show the half-brothers the way home.

Wirt, the older brother, is a worry-prone teenager who would rather keep to himself than have to make a decision. His passions include playing the clarinet and writing poetry, but he usually keeps these private out of fear of being mocked. On the other hand, Greg, the younger brother, is more naïve and carefree, much to Wirt's chagrin. Greg carries a frog (Jack Jones) that he found; Greg's attempts to give the frog a name are a running gag. Stalking the main cast is the Beast (Samuel Ramey), an ancient creature who leads lost souls astray until they lose their hope and willpower and turn into "Edelwood trees". Once they find Adelaide, Wirt discovers that she intends only to enslave the boys; outraged that Beatrice misled them, Wirt takes Greg and abandons her.

Final chapters
The penultimate episode reveals that Wirt and Greg are modern children who entered the Unknown after falling into a pond on Halloween. Wirt, attempting to take back some embarrassing poetry and clarinet tape he made for a girl he is infatuated with, had followed her to a ghost story party in a graveyard, where a police officer scares him and Greg into jumping over the cemetery's garden wall. On the other side of the wall, they landed on a train track. To save Greg from being hit by a train, Wirt pulled him into a nearby pond, knocking them both unconscious in the process and sending them to a Limbo-like realm between life and death.

In the final episode, Wirt saves Greg from being turned into an Edelwood tree by the Beast. At the end of the episode, Wirt and Greg wake up in a hospital back in their hometown. As the scene ends, Greg's frog, which swallowed a magic bell in the Unknown, begins to glow, suggesting that their experience in the Unknown may have been real. The series ends with a montage of how Wirt and Greg affected the inhabitants of the Unknown.

Production
Over the Garden Wall was first envisioned in 2004 with a scarier and more adventure-based storyline. Before working as a storyboard artist on The Marvelous Misadventures of Flapjack, artist Patrick McHale pitched the show in 2006, then known under the title Tome of the Unknown. The series would follow two brothers—Walter and Gregory—who, after signing themselves into a Faustian deal with a devil named Old Scratch, journey across the Land of the In-Between to track down the pages of a book of forgotten stories.

McHale saw it as "a possible Halloween special", but had trouble adapting the premise with a larger story arc. After his work for Flapjack, McHale moved on to co-develop Adventure Time, where he served as creative director, and subsequently as a writer. The network later asked him if he had interest in developing a pilot, which led to him returning to Tome of the Unknown, polishing it and pitching it again to the network. After creating a pilot episode, Tome of the Unknown: Harvest Melody, McHale and the network settled upon the miniseries format for the ensuing series, as McHale felt that it would lead to "something that felt higher quality than what we could do with a regular series". McHale abandoned the original idea centered around chapters of a mystical tome and the series' title became Over the Garden Wall.

Production for Over the Garden Wall commenced in late 2013. McHale initially envisioned eighteen chapters in the series, but the episode count was brought to ten to accommodate budget and time constraints. Early drafts of episodes from the show's pitch bible included a skinless witch character and a villain who carves dice from the bones of kidnapped children, as well a running plot throughout four episodes in which Wirt and Gregory are transformed into animals (Gregory being a duck and Wirt being "either a bear or a dog ... Nobody can tell which").

The ten episodes marked the first miniseries on the Cartoon Network. The show features Wood and Dean (reprising their roles from the short), along with Lynskey as the main voice cast. McHale and his crew tried to maintain a balance between frightening imagery and "episodes that are just light and funny". For the music, McHale drew inspiration from "classic American, opera singing". Nick Cross served as art director and Nate Cash as supervising director; both worked with McHale alongside storyboard artists located in New York and Chicago. This distance proved difficult for McHale, who found it "particularly daunting considering the idiosyncratic nature of the production". 

The series' art was inspired by a variety of sources, including the 1890s McLoughlin Brothers board game Game of Frog Pond, illustrations by Gustave Doré for Cervantes's Don Quixote, old illustrations for the Hans Christian Andersen story "The Tinderbox", the Cheshire Cat illustration by John Tenniel from Alice's Adventures in Wonderland, and the "Dogville Comedies" short films. McHale referenced chromolithography, vintage Halloween postcards, magic lantern slides, and photographs of New England foliage to create the show's style.

Cast

Main voices

 Elijah Wood as Wirt
 Collin Dean as Gregory (Greg)
 Melanie Lynskey as Beatrice
 Christopher Lloyd as the Woodsman
 Jack Jones as Greg's Frog
 Samuel Ramey as the Beast

Various voices

 Emily Brundige as Sara
 Mark Bodnar as the North Wind
 John Cleese as Quincy Endicott and Adelaide
 Tim Curry as Auntie Whispers
 Noureen DeWulf as Pumpkin Gal
 Frank Fairfield as the Toy Maker
 Chris Isaak as Enoch
 Shirley Jones as Beatrice's Mother
 Janet Klein as Miss Langtree
 Thomas Lennon as Jimmy Brown
 Sam Marin as Mr. Langtree
 Judah Nelson as the Cloud City Reception Committee
 Bebe Neuwirth as Margueritte Grey
 Jerron "Blind Boy" Paxton as the Highwayman
 Cole Sanchez as Jason Funderberker
 Shannyn Sossamon as Lorna
 Fred Stoller as Fred the Horse
 Deborah Voigt as Queen of the Clouds
 Audrey Wasilewski as the Tavern Keeper

Episodes

Series overview

Pilot (2013)

Miniseries (2014)

Broadcast
McHale's original short, Tome of the Unknown, was screened at the 2014 Santa Barbara International Film Festival, where McHale earned the Bruce Corwin Award for best animated short film. It also received an honorable mention at the 2013 Ottawa International Animation Festival.

At the 2014 San Diego Comic-Con International, a preview of the show was screened along with various panels for other shows on the network. Episode 2 was previewed at the 2014 New York Comic Con, which McHale and the main cast attended. The show made its premiere on November 3, 2014 on Cartoon Network, and ran over five consecutive nights. The entirety of it was published on iTunes preceding its broadcast. 

The series aired on Cartoon Network in Australia from December 15 to 19, 2014 and on Cartoon Network in the United Kingdom and Ireland from April 6 to 10, 2015.

Music

Various melodies and songs based on pre-1950s music are heard throughout the series. Elijah Wood, the voice actor for Wirt, has said that "if this show were a record, it would be played on a phonograph". Songs from the series include "Into the Unknown", its title song, composed by Patrick McHale and sung by Jack Jones; "A Courting Song", composed by the Petrojvic Blasting Company and performed by Frank Fairfield; and "Come Wayward Souls", sung by Samuel Ramey as the Beast.

The majority of the series' songs have been officially uploaded to YouTube. On the DVD release they can be heard, along with visuals and without dialogue, in a special feature known as the Composer's Cut. An extended version of the soundtrack, featuring 32 tracks and totaling around 44 minutes in length, was released in the form of a 180-gram vinyl record by Mondo in August 2016. The extended soundtrack debuted at the San Diego Comic-Con, with a limited 1,000 copies, featuring a cover designed by Sam Wolfe Connelly. The extended vinyl is also available as a webstore exclusive from Mondo.

In September 2015, Mondo released an audio cassette tape titled "For Sara", based on the cassette tape labelled with the same name seen in the series. The cassette features over twenty minutes of poetry spoken by Elijah Wood (in character as Wirt) and music performed by the Blasting Company. In September 2017, Mondo released the cassette a second time, with the subtitle "(Back-Up Master)".

Home media
Over the Garden Wall (with the short film Tome of the Unknown) was released on DVD in Australia on July 8, 2015 by Cartoon Network and Madman Entertainment and by Cartoon Network and its sister company Warner Home Video on September 8, 2015, in the United States. The DVD features all ten episodes of the show, commentaries, the original pilot, alternate title cards, and deleted animatics. Other extras on the DVD include a "Composer's Cut," an option wherein a viewer can watch the show with only the visuals and the background music; and the mini-documentary Behind Over the Garden Wall.

On April 6, 2016, Madman Entertainment released the miniseries on Blu-ray exclusively in Australia and New Zealand with the same bonus content as the DVD release. On March 2, 2020, Manga Entertainment released it in the UK on Blu-Ray and DVD.

Reception

Critical reception
Over the Garden Wall was critically acclaimed. On review aggregator Rotten Tomatoes, the series has an approval rating of 93% based on 15 reviews, with an average rating of 8.60/10. The website's critics consensus reads, "Over the Garden Wall's modern sensibilities mix well with its fairy-tale setting, creating a whimsically witty series for viewers of all ages."

Preceding its premiere, Patrick Kevin Day of the Los Angeles Times called it "funny, creepy" and, from the premise, "not as simple as it sounds". In TV Guide and also before the premiere, Megan Walsh-Boyle felt that the show's fictional universe "sounds like a world worth getting lost in". Meredith Woerner of io9 called a preview of the show "amazing", "weird, and cute and great", reflecting "all the things we love about this oddball animation renaissance we are currently living in". Conversely, Amid Amidi of Cartoon Brew judged from the same preview that the animation was lacking. While not discounting its storytelling, music, and production design, he felt that production skimped on animation; he was still looking forward to the series.

Robert Lloyd of the Los Angeles Times wrote that it was "a little too folksy and fairy story" at times, but that its "contemporary strangeness wins out", and concluded that "it is throughout something to behold". Lloyd later wrote that it evoked "a kind of artisanal quality", both in its design and setting, and though the writing felt "a little too intent on its own folksiness", it became more enjoyable throughout. In The New York Times, Mike Hale also felt the writing was sometimes weak and the stories "perilously thin", but concluded that McHale developed an environment worth visiting.

Brian Moylan of The Guardian wrote that the visuals were "absolutely stunning", and that the stories contained "a certain darkness to it that is both mellow and twee at the same time, with a fair amount of anxiety creeping around the edges". Brian Lowry of Variety wrote that Garden Wall was "an admirable experiment", but not one to sustain "the five-night commitment", calling it "slightly mismatched" while praising a departure from "the more abrasive characteristic" of the network's primetime content. Kevin McDonough of the Illinois Daily Journal criticized some of the writing, but summed it up as "an ambitious cartoon" for both younger and older audiences. Jason Bree of the website Agents of Geek called the miniseries "the greatest thing Cartoon Network has ever produced". Kevin Johnson of The A.V. Club praised the series, giving it a grade of "A" and writing that "with such a perfect blend of mood, atmosphere, story, and characterization, Over the Garden Walls 10-episode run will leave you wanting more, but like every great fairy tale, it's a story that knows when it's over."

Awards and nominations

Comic book adaptation
A one-shot comic book adaptation of the show was announced in October 2014. Produced by KaBoom!, an imprint of Boom! Studios, the comic was released on November 5, 2014. The comic was supervised by McHale and was produced as an oversized special. The comic was illustrated by Jim Campbell, a writer/storyboard artist on the television series. A special variant cover, by McHale, was also released. The success of the standalone comic led to further issues being commissioned in May 2015 and began to be released in August 2015. According to McHale, the comic books would be similar to the one-shot comic, detailing the events that occurred in between certain episodes and would expand on the television miniseries. The success of the series of one-shots led to an ongoing series of comics, serving as both a sequel and prequel to the series, rather than telling adventures that happened between episodes. The stories are told parallel, with half the comic detailing Greg returning to mysterious dreamlands in his sleep. The other half chronicles the Woodsman's daughter, Anna, and how she became lost in the Unknown. After the ongoing series ended in November 2017, the Over the Garden Wall comics continued as a series of miniseries and original graphic novels.

References

Further reading

External links

 
 

2010s American animated television miniseries 
2010s American black comedy television series
2010s American comedy-drama television series
2010s American comedy television miniseries 
2014 American television series debuts
2014 American television series endings
Boom! Studios titles
American children's animated adventure television series
American children's animated comedy television series
American children's animated drama television series
American children's animated fantasy television series
American children's animated horror television series
American children's animated musical television series
American children's animated mystery television series
Cartoon Network original programming
Television series by Cartoon Network Studios
Cartoon Network franchises
Halloween television specials
Dark fantasy television series
Magic realism television series
Animated television series about brothers
Television shows adapted into comics
English-language television shows
Emmy Award-winning programs
Limbo